Jeffrey Alan Rockwell is a retired lieutenant general in the United States Air Force. He served as the United States Air Force Judge Advocate General from May 2018 to May 2022.

Effective dates of promotions

Awards and decorations

References

|-

1960s births
Living people
Recipients of the Air Force Distinguished Service Medal
Recipients of the Legion of Merit
Year of birth uncertain